Bugg is a surname. Notable people with the surname include:

 Damian Bugg, Australian lawyer and Director of Public Prosecutions 1999–2007
 Francis Bugg (1640–1727), English writer against Quakerism
 George Bugg (1769–1851), Anglican deacon and curate in England and a Scriptural geologist
 James Bugg (1882–1964), Australian politician
 Jace Bugg (1976–2003), American golfer
 Jake Bugg (Jake Edwin Charles Kennedy, born 1994), English musician and songwriter
 Mary Ann Bugg (1834–1867), Australian bushranger
 Matthew Bugg (born 1981), Australian sailor
 Rachel Bugg (born 1989), Australian diver
 Robert Malone Bugg, American politician and a member of the U.S. House of Representatives 1853–1855
 Stuart G. Bugg (born 1958), British-born lawyer and author
 Thomas Bugg, English rugby league footballer of the 1920s
 Tomas Bugg (born 1993), Australian rules footballer

See also
 
 Bugg (disambiguation)